Orania rosea is a species of sea snail, a marine gastropod mollusk in the family Muricidae, the murex snails or rock snails.

Description

Distribution
This species occurs in the Indian Ocean off Réunion.

References

 Houart, R.; Kilburn, R. N. & Marais, A. P. (2010). Muricidae. pp. 176-270, in: Marais A.P. & Seccombe A.D. (eds), Identification guide to the seashells of South Africa. Volume 1. Groenkloof: Centre for Molluscan Studies. 376 pp.

External links
 Houart, R. (1996). Description of two new species of Muricidae (Gastropoda) from the Indo-West Pacific. Venus. 55 (4): 273-280
 Hedley C. (1899). The Mollusca of Funafuti. Part I - Gasteropoda. Memoirs of the Australian Museum. 3(7): 395-488, pl. 27

Gastropods described in 1996
Orania (gastropod)